Hey Joe / Radio Ethiopia is the first EP by Patti Smith Group, released in 1977 on Arista Records.

Track listing

Side one 
 "Hey Joe" (Patti Smith, Billy Roberts) – 5:05

Side two 
 "Radio Ethiopia" (Smith, Lenny Kaye) – 15:40
Recorded live at CBGBs, New York on June 5, 1977

Personnel 
Patti Smith Group
 Patti Smith – vocals, guitar
 Lenny Kaye – guitar
 Jay Dee Daugherty – drums
 Ivan Kral – bass
 Richard Sohl – piano, organ
Additional personnel
 Allen Lanier – audio mixing
 Tom Verlaine – guitar on "Hey Joe"
 Dave Palmer – engineering

Release history

Notes

External links 
 

Patti Smith albums
1977 debut EPs
Albums produced by Jimmy Iovine
Arista Records EPs